Joe Stefanelli (March 20, 1921 – September 27, 2017), also known as Joseph J. Stefanelli, belonged to the New York School Abstract Expressionist artists whose influence and artistic innovation by the 1950s had been recognized around the world. New York School Abstract Expressionism, represented by Jackson Pollock, Willem de Kooning, Franz Kline and others became a leading art movement of the  era that followed World War II. He died in September 2017 at the age of 96.

Biography
Stefanelli grew up in a large working-class Italian-American family in South Philadelphia. He was born March 20, 1921, in Philadelphia, Pennsylvania.

Studied painting
1938–1940: Philadelphia Museum School,
1940–1941: Pennsylvania Academy of Fine Arts
1948–1949: Hofmann School of Fine Art
1949–1950: New School for Social Research
1950–1951: Art Students League of New York

Military service in World War II
Stefanelli entered the Army during World War II. Eventually he was working as an illustrator, from 1942 to 1946 provided field drawings that were published in "’Artists for Yank Magazine’’’. He traveled all over the South Pacific as a combat artist. Today these works are housed in the permanent collection of the World War II Archives Building, Washington, D.C.

Participation in the downtown art scene
He had his studio in the Lower East Side, on 22nd Street. Stefanelli soon joined the "Downtown Group" which represented a group of artists who found studios in lower Manhattan. Franz Kline introduced Stefanelli to 'The Artists’ Club’. located at 39 East 8th Street.
Stefanelli was chosen by his fellow artists to show in the Ninth Street Show held on May 21 – June 10, 1951.
The show was located at 60 East 9th Street on the first floor and the basement of a building which was about to be demolished: "The artists celebrated not only the appearance of the dealers, collectors and museum people on the 9th Street, and the consequent exposure of their work but they celebrated the creation and the strength of a living community of significant dimensions."

Stefanelli participated in 1951 and from 1954 to 1957 in the invitational New York Painting and Sculpture Annuals including the Ninth Street Show. These Annuals were important because the participants were chosen by the artists themselves.

Teaching positions
By the 1960s Stefanelli, like many of his contemporaries, taught art in major universities.
1960, 1963: University of California, Berkeley, California
1963–1966: Princeton University, Princeton, New Jersey
1966: New School for Social Research, New York City
1966–1974: Columbia University, New York City
1974–1977: Brooklyn College, Brooklyn, New York
1979–1980: New York University, New York City

Selected solo exhibitions
1950, 1954: Artists’ Gallery, New York City
1952: The New Gallery, New York City
1953: Hendler Gallery, New York City
1956: Ganymede Gallery, Cleveland, Ohio and New York City
1957, 1958, 1960: Poindexter Gallery, New York City
1962: Hacker Gallery, New York City
1963: Thibault Gallery, New York City
1964, Princeton University, Princeton, New Jersey
1965: University of Arkansas, Fayetteville, Arkansas
1971: Westbeth Gallery, New York City
1972, 1982: New School for Social Research, New York City
1973–1974: The New Bertha Schaefer Gallery, New York City
1974: Terry Dintenfass Gallery, New York City
1977: Andre Zarre Gallery, New York City
1978: Temple University, Rome Italy
1980: Landmark Gallery, Southampton, Long Island, New York
1981: Benson Gallery. Meridian, Mississippi
1986: Ingber Art Gallery, Ltd., New York City
1988–1989: Armstrong Gallery, New York City
1989: R. H. Love Gallery, Chicago, Illinois; Randal Gallery, St Louis, Missouri
1992, 1994: Olaf Clasen Gallery, Cologne, Germany
1999: Galerie Schröder und Dörr, Bergisch Gladbach, Germany
2000–2001: Little Van Gogh, Bad Honnef, Germany
2000–2008: Gallerie Barbara von Stechow, Frankfurt, Germany
2004: CherryStoneGallery, Wellfleet, Massachusetts
2006 :Ludwig Museum, Koblenz, Germany
2008: Yellowstone Art Museum, Billings, Montana

In 1988: Stefanelli received a retrospective exhibition at the Pennsylvania Academy of Fine Arts

Selected group exhibitions
1950: "New Talent Show" Kootz Gallery, New York City
1951: 9th Street Art Exhibition, New York City
1952–1956: Tanager Gallery, New York City
1954–1957: "New York Painting and Sculpture Annual," Stable Gallery, New York City
1953, 1955: Whitney Museum of American Art Annuals New York City
1960: "60 Americans: 1960” Walker Art Center, Minneapolis, Minnesota
1963–1964: "Hans Hofmann and His Students," circ., Museum of Modern Art, Manhattan, New York
1991: "Paintings of the 60s," M-13 Gallery, New York City
1994: "Reclaiming Artists of the New York School. Toward a More Inclusive View of the 1950s", Baruch College City University, New York City; "New York-Provincetown: A 50s Connection", Provincetown Art Association and Museum, Provincetown, Massachusetts
2000: Nassau County Museum of Art, Roslyn Harbor, New York

Awards
Stefanelli has received number of awards:
1971: New York State Council of Art, New York
2000: Pollock-Krasner Foundation, New York City for his life work
2005: Benjamin Altman Prize, National Academy for painting

Works in museums and public collections
National Academy of Design
Whitney Museum of American Art, New York City
Yellowstone Art Museum, Billings, Montana

References

United States. Army Service Forces. Special Service Division.; National Gallery of Art (US), Soldier art ([Washington] Infantry Journal, 1945.
Marika Herskovic, New York School Abstract Expressionists Artists Choice by Artists, (New York School Press, 2000.)  p.  32; 38; 350–353;
Smithsonian Institution Research Information System; Archival, Manuscript and Photographic Collections, Joe Stefanelli

External links
Joe Stefanelli views of the studio exhibition at the Ludwig Museum, Koblenz, Germany

See also

Art movement
9th Street Art Exhibition
Abstract expressionism
Action painting
New York School

1921 births
2017 deaths
Abstract expressionist artists
Modern painters
Painters from New York City
20th-century American painters
American male painters
21st-century American painters
Painters from Pennsylvania
Brooklyn College faculty
20th-century American male artists